The Alte Utting is a bar, nightclub and music venue in Munich. The decommissioned, land-bound passenger ship is placed on a railway bridge that crosses an inner-city arterial road, and is regarded as one of the most spectacular nightlife spots of the city.

History and Description

Use as a passenger ship (1950–2016) 

Use as a nightlife spot (since 2018) 
The ship was decommissioned in 2016 and then bought by the Kulturverein Wannda e.V. in Munich, which by then already had made a name for itself with other subcultural projects such as the nightclub Bahnwärter Thiel or the permanent festival Wannda Circus, and which was able to finance the project from the revenues of these event locations. On 21 and 22 February 2017 the hull of the ship and the superstructures were transported from the Ammersee lake to Munich. For the night-time transport to Munich, the Autobahn had to be closed by the police. After its arrival in Munich, the 144-ton ship was deployed on a former railway bridge close to the Wholesale Market Munich that crosses an inner-city arterial road, and the conversion to a nightlife and cultural venue started. Due to tremendous static and safety-relevant requirements the opening of the venue was delayed for more than one year. On 12 July 2018 the former ship was christened to the name Alte Utting on the railway bridge by the head of the municipal planning and building control office Julia Schönfeld-Knor. After completion of the reconstruction measures, the party ship is opened daily since the 26 July 2018 and is primarily used as a bar, restaurant, discothèque (in the engine room), music venue and cabaret stage. As the Alte Utting quickly established itself as an attraction that is known far beyond the city borders, local politicians plan to preserve it permanently.

Reception
The Alte Utting and its cultural events regularly receive media attention by local, nationwide and international media. The New York Times described the Alte Utting as an example of hip night life spots in Munich "that could give Berlin a run for its money". According to the Süddeutsche Zeitung, the Alte Utting has become "a kind of landmark" of the city of Munich.

Gallery

External links

References

Nightclubs in Munich
Buildings and structures in Munich
Music venues in Munich
Culture in Munich